The 2020 Suzuki Polish Basketball Cup was the 56th edition of Poland's national cup competition for men basketball teams. It was managed by the Polish Basketball League (PLK) and was held in Warsaw, in the Arena Ursynów for the fourth time in a row. Anwil Włocławek won its fourth Cup title in club history.

Qualified teams
The eight first qualified after the first half of the 2019–20 PLK season qualified to the tournament. The highest-placed four teams would play the lowest-seeded teams in the quarter-finals. Legia Warsaw qualified as host of the tournament, and gained automatic qualification.

Bracket

Final

See also
2019–20 PLK season

References

Polish Basketball Cup
Cup